Damaged Lives is a 1933 Canadian/American pre-Code exploitation film directed by Edgar G. Ulmer. The screenplay is based on the French play Les Avariés (1901) by Eugène Brieux.
 
The film was shot at General Service Studios, Hollywood, California for the Canadian Social Health Council and premiered in Toronto, Ontario.

Damaged Lives was initially released in Canada and a few cities in the United States but screenings were blocked by censors in most American towns. In 1937, the film was re-released as The Shocking Truth with a 29-minute supplementary lecture on VD added onto the end of the film to satisfy censors. Most current video releases do not include this extra material.

Plot
The film hinges on a casual sexual encounter.

A boss insists that a young executive, with an important job and a long-term girlfriend, go out for the evening with an important client.  They go to a swank party, where he meets the businessman's escort.  Their personalities connect, and after the businessman leaves with another woman, they leave together and have a casual sexual encounter. The next day, the executive proposes to his girlfriend, they marry, and she becomes pregnant.  The escort subsequently learns that she has syphilis from the businessman and summons the executive.  She informs him of the situation, then kills herself.

Later, a medical exam on the wife reveals that her unborn child has syphilis, indicating that one or both of the parents are syphilitic.  The executive reveals that he passed it on from the escort. Their friends, while supportive, now want to avoid physical contact with the pair. The distraught wife then tries to kill herself and her husband, thinking that they could never live a normal life.

The husband tries to console his wife...explaining how treatments are available and that they can be cured.  When another friend calls the wife to say she also has syphilis and her worries are so trivial, the wife finally realizes she will be okay.

Cast

Production
Filmed in 1933, this cautionary tale was distributed under the name Weldon Pictures, because Columbia did not want to be associated with the topic of the film. The end title of the Internet Archive print says the film was an Educational Film Exchanges, Inc. release.

Although some scenes in the film were cut by state film censor boards in Maryland and Ohio, it was still very popular in the United States. For example, in Baltimore 65,000 people saw the film, representing approximately 10% of the population.

Damaged Lives was distributed in Britain through the British Social Hygiene Council (BSHC), which claimed a total viewership of around four million people between August 1933 and May 1934. The BSHC also claimed to have distributed more than 126,000 pamphlets to audience members with information on syphilis treatment.

References

External links

1933 films
1930s English-language films
1933 drama films
American films based on plays
Films directed by Edgar G. Ulmer
American black-and-white films
Films about syphilis
American drama films
Canadian drama films
English-language Canadian films
Canadian black-and-white films
Films shot in California
1930s American films
1930s Canadian films